Lentibacillus salarius is a Gram-positive, spore-forming and moderately halophilic bacterium from the genus of Lentibacillus which has been isolated from  saline sedimens from the Xinjiang Province.

References

Bacillaceae
Bacteria described in 2005